State Line is an unincorporated community in Clay Township, St. Joseph County, in the U.S. state of Indiana.

The community is close to the state border between Indiana and Michigan, and is part of the South Bend–Mishawaka IN-MI, Metropolitan Statistical Area.

Geography

References

Unincorporated communities in St. Joseph County, Indiana
Unincorporated communities in Indiana
South Bend – Mishawaka metropolitan area